Mount Lyell may refer to:

Mount Lyell (California), U.S., in Yosemite National Park
Mount Lyell (Tasmania), Australia
Mount Lyell (Western Australia), in the Kimberley region
Mount Lyell (Canada), on the Alberta–British Columbia boundary

See also
1912 North Mount Lyell disaster
Mount Lyell Mining and Railway Company, Tasmania (1897-1994)